The Gang's All Here is a 1939 British, black-and-white, comedy-mystery, directed by Thornton Freeland and starring Jack Buchanan. It was produced by Associated British Picture Corporation. Subsequently, the film was released in the U.S. in 1943 with the title The Amazing Mr. Forrest.

Synopsis
The dapper musical comedy favourite, Jack Buchanan is practically the whole show in The Gang's All Here. Buchanan plays John Forrest, a top investigator for the Stamford Insurance Company. Retiring from the firm, Forrest intends to devote the rest of his life to writing detective fiction, but this plan goes out the window when his former employers are robbed of $1,000,000 in jewels belonging to foreign potentate Prince Homouska. With the help of his befuddled butler Treadwell, Forrest follows the trail of clues to American gangster boss Alberni (Jack La Rue), capturing his quarry with a variety of slapstick subterfuges.

Cast
 Jack Buchanan as John Forrest
 Googie Withers as Alice Forrest
 Edward Everett Horton as Treadwell
 Syd Walker as Younce
 Otto Kruger as Mike Chadwick
 Jack La Rue as Alberni
 Walter Rilla as Prince Homouska
 David Burns as Beretti
 Charles Carson as Charles Cartwright
 Leslie Perrins as Harper
 Ronald Shiner as Spider Ferris

Critical reception
TV Guide wrote, "supposed comedy about the breakup of a group of jewel thieves falls flat. But no amount of dreary material can conceal the undeniable comic genius of Horton"; while Allmovie noted, "The Gang's All Here remains one of Jack Buchanan's best-loved vehicles."

See also
 Smash and Grab (1937)

References

External links
 
 
 
 
 1944 review of film at Variety

1939 films
British black-and-white films
British musical comedy-drama films
Films directed by Thornton Freeland
1930s musical comedy-drama films
British sequel films
Films set in London
Films shot at Associated British Studios
Films shot at Welwyn Studios
1930s English-language films
1930s British films